Alsens IF is a Swedish football club located in Alsen situated in Krokom Municipality, Jämtland County.

Background
Since their foundation Alsens IF has participated mainly in the middle and lower divisions of the Swedish football league system.  The club currently plays in Division 3 Mellersta Norrland which is the fifth tier of Swedish football. They play their home matches at the Bleckåsvallen IP in Alsen.

Alsens IF are affiliated to Jämtland-Härjedalens Fotbollförbund.

Season to season

Footnotes

External links
 Alsens IF – Official website
 Alsens IF on Facebook

Football clubs in Jämtland County